Gérard Bruchési (born March 30, 1931) is a Canadian former politician and insurance broker. He was elected to the House of Commons of Canada as a Member of the Progressive Conservative Party in the 1958 election to represent the riding of Beauharnois—Salaberry. He was defeated in the 1962 election.

Bruchési was born in Montreal, Quebec.

References

External links
 

1931 births
Living people
Members of the House of Commons of Canada from Quebec
Politicians from Montreal
Progressive Conservative Party of Canada MPs
Candidates in the 1962 Canadian federal election